Blaž Zbičajnik (born 24 July 1995) is a Slovenian football midfielder who plays for Dravinja on loan from Celje.

References

External links
NZS profile 
PrvaLiga profile 

1995 births
Living people
Sportspeople from Celje
Slovenian footballers
Association football midfielders
NK Celje players
NK Drava Ptuj (2004) players
Slovenian PrvaLiga players